Nanwu Si Monastery is a Tibetan Buddhist monastery west of the town of Kangding in Kangding County of the Garzê Tibetan Autonomous Prefecture, in Sichuan Province, southwestern China.

The complex of traditional architecture is located in the historical Tibetan region of Kham. The monastery is home to about 80 Buddhist monks.

See also
Tibetan Buddhism

References
Lonely Planet — Nanwu Si

External links

Buddhist monasteries in Sichuan
Garzê Tibetan Autonomous Prefecture